Karpasia may refer to:
 Karpass Peninsula, the long, finger-like peninsula of northeastern Cyprus
 Karpasia (town), an ancient townsite on the peninsula.